KIRO may refer to:

 KIRO (AM), a radio station (710 AM) licensed to Seattle, Washington, United States
 KIRO-TV, a television station (channel 23, virtual 7) licensed to Seattle, Washington, United States
 KIRO-FM, a radio station (97.3 FM) licensed to Tacoma, Washington, United States
 KKWF, a radio station (100.7 FM) licensed to Seattle, Washington, United States, which used the call sign KIRO-FM from September 1992 to May 1999
 Kiro, a colonial post in what is now the Central Equatoria province of South Sudan
 Kiro, a Macedonian name and it come from a Greek word "Kyrios"